Darren Gaspar (born 20 May 1976) is a former Australian rules footballer in the Australian Football League (AFL).

AFL career

Sydney Swans career (1994–1995)
Gaspar was drafted with the first pick in the 1993 National Draft by the Sydney Swans. He debuted against the Adelaide Crows in round three of the 1994 AFL season and injured his medial ligament in the third quarter, which resulted in him playing only five games for the year. 

After only two seasons with the Swans, he turned down a one-year deal and moved to the Richmond Football Club via the 1996 Pre-season Draft.

Richmond career (1996–2007)

Robert Walls was influential in getting Gaspar to Richmond and he provided the emerging full-back with vital experience, playing him on Jason Dunstall and Tony Lockett in his first few games with the club.

His consistency saw him hold down the full-back position for over a decade with the Tigers. He finished runner-up in the Jack Dyer Medal behind Andrew Kellaway and earned All-Australian selection in 2000. Gaspar continued his good form in 2001, winning the Jack Dyer Medal and helping Richmond reach the finals for the first time since the 1995 AFL season. For the second consecutive year, he was named in the All-Australian team. He turned down a lucrative offer from the Fremantle Dockers at the end of the 2001 AFL season and remained at the Tigers.

In 2003, Gaspar was selected as the Australia international rules football team's goalkeeper for the 2001 International Rules Series in Australia. Australia lost the series 2–0, with a 130–105 aggregate score.

Injuries took a toll on him towards the end of his playing career, but he continued to give Richmond valuable service in the back half. At the age of 31 years, Gaspar announced his retirement after the fifth round of the 2007 AFL season, finishing on 228 games, after a disagreement with his coach, Terry Wallace, over his position in the team.

He currently commentates alongside Tim Gossage for SEN, covering West Coast Eagles games at Patersons Stadium.

Statistics

|-
|- style="background-color: #EAEAEA"
! scope="row" style="text-align:center" | 1994
|style="text-align:center;"|
| 20 || 5 || 0 || 0 || 31 || 23 || 54 || 17 || 10 || 0.0 || 0.0 || 6.2 || 4.6 || 10.8 || 3.4 || 2.0 || 0
|-
! scope="row" style="text-align:center" | 1995
|style="text-align:center;"|
| 20 || 16 || 1 || 1 || 91 || 66 || 157 || 31 || 21 || 0.1 || 0.1 || 5.7 || 4.1 || 9.8 || 1.9 || 1.3 || 0
|- style="background-color: #EAEAEA"
! scope="row" style="text-align:center" | 1996
|style="text-align:center;"|
| 2 || 20 || 1 || 0 || 143 || 97 || 240 || 48 || 32 || 0.1 || 0.0 || 7.2 || 4.9 || 12.0 || 2.4 || 1.6 || 0
|-
! scope="row" style="text-align:center" | 1997
|style="text-align:center;"|
| 2 || 21 || 0 || 1 || 164 || 135 || 299 || 73 || 34 || 0.0 || 0.0 || 7.8 || 6.4 || 14.2 || 3.5 || 1.6 || 12
|- style="background-color: #EAEAEA"
! scope="row" style="text-align:center" | 1998
|style="text-align:center;"|
| 2 || 21 || 5 || 3 || 128 || 164 || 292 || 73 || 32 || 0.2 || 0.1 || 6.1 || 7.8 || 13.9 || 3.5 || 1.5 || 7
|-
! scope="row" style="text-align:center" | 1999
|style="text-align:center;"|
| 2 || 21 || 2 || 0 || 100 || 98 || 198 || 43 || 20 || 0.1 || 0.0 || 4.8 || 4.7 || 9.4 || 2.0 || 1.0 || 2
|- style="background-color: #EAEAEA"
! scope="row" style="text-align:center" | 2000
|style="text-align:center;"|
| 2 || 17 || 3 || 2 || 114 || 78 || 192 || 53 || 18 || 0.2 || 0.1 || 6.7 || 4.6 || 11.3 || 3.1 || 1.1 || 5
|-
! scope="row" style="text-align:center" | 2001
|style="text-align:center;"|
| 2 || 25 || 1 || 1 || 178 || 132 || 310 || 104 || 30 || 0.0 || 0.0 || 7.1 || 5.3 || 12.4 || 4.2 || 1.2 || 6
|- style="background-color: #EAEAEA"
! scope="row" style="text-align:center" | 2002
|style="text-align:center;"|
| 2 || 19 || 2 || 1 || 139 || 102 || 241 || 72 || 17 || 0.1 || 0.1 || 7.3 || 5.4 || 12.7 || 3.8 || 0.9 || 0
|-
! scope="row" style="text-align:center" | 2003
|style="text-align:center;"|
| 2 || 11 || 2 || 0 || 60 || 50 || 110 || 38 || 14 || 0.2 || 0.0 || 5.5 || 4.5 || 10.0 || 3.5 || 1.3 || 0
|- style="background-color: #EAEAEA"
! scope="row" style="text-align:center" | 2004
|style="text-align:center;"|
| 2 || 19 || 5 || 1 || 99 || 64 || 163 || 56 || 24 || 0.3 || 0.1 || 5.2 || 3.4 || 8.6 || 2.9 || 1.3 || 0
|-
! scope="row" style="text-align:center" | 2005
|style="text-align:center;"|
| 2 || 20 || 1 || 0 || 138 || 92 || 230 || 79 || 11 || 0.1 || 0.0 || 6.9 || 4.6 || 11.5 || 4.0 || 0.6 || 1
|- style="background-color: #EAEAEA"
! scope="row" style="text-align:center" | 2006
|style="text-align:center;"|
| 2 || 8 || 0 || 0 || 29 || 34 || 63 || 19 || 19 || 0.0 || 0.0 || 3.6 || 4.3 || 7.9 || 2.4 || 2.4 || 0
|-
! scope="row" style="text-align:center" | 2007
|style="text-align:center;"|
| 2 || 5 || 0 || 0 || 31 || 27 || 58 || 21 || 13 || 0.0 || 0.0 || 6.2 || 5.4 || 11.6 || 4.2 || 2.6 || 0
|- class="sortbottom"
! colspan=3| Career
! 228
! 23
! 10
! 1445
! 1162
! 2607
! 727
! 295
! 0.1
! 0.0
! 6.3
! 5.1
! 11.4
! 3.2
! 1.3
! 33
|}

Personal life
He is the brother of former AFL players, Damien Gaspar and Travis Gaspar. 

Gaspar is also the part-owner of racehorse Roman Arch.

References

External links

Richmond Football Club players
1976 births
Living people
Sydney Swans players
South Fremantle Football Club players
All-Australians (AFL)
Jack Dyer Medal winners
Australian people of Croatian descent
Australian rules footballers from Western Australia
Western Australian State of Origin players
Australia international rules football team players